The Fender Vibratone was a Leslie speaker designed for use with electric guitars, manufactured by Fender from 1967-1972. Named after the first Leslie speaker made for the Hammond Organ in 1941, the Vibratone was associated with the electric guitar, although it was used in vocals on many famous songs. The Vibratone was essentially an equivalent of the Leslie 16. A prime example of the Vibratone's sound is on the song "Cold Shot" by Stevie Ray Vaughan.

History
In the mid-1960s, guitarists, from bands like The Beach Boys, started experimenting by playing through Leslies. At the time, Fender was bought by CBS, who owned the patents to the Leslie company. The Fender Vibratone was introduced in 1967. Since its introduction, many groups like The Beatles, The Byrds, The Zombies, Blind Faith, as well as guitarists like Mike Campbell, David Gilmour, and Stevie Ray Vaughan, all have used the Vibratone in their recordings.

Design
Unlike a high fidelity speaker, the Vibratone was specifically designed to alter or modify the sound. It consisted of a single driver unit, particularly a 10-inch guitar speaker, with a 15-inch Styrofoam cylindrical rotor in front of it. The cylinder was mechanically rotated by a motor through a rubber belt to create various effects, like chorus and vibrato, based on the Doppler effect. Like a traditional Leslie, the effect could be changed, via a two-button footswitch, between slow and fast speeds, or switched off altogether.

Much of the Vibratone's unique tone comes from the fact that the cabinet uses a guitar speaker, instead of a horn and woofer. The effect was dispersed vertically, unlike the Leslie that is dispersed horizontally, with grilles on the sides and top of the cabinet. With no built-in preamp, the Vibratone had to be powered by a separate guitar amplifier; in recording situations, microphones were placed next to the grilles in order for the effect to be heard. A crossover was also built-in, with the Vibratone handling the mid-range frequencies, and sending the high/low frequencies to the driving amplifier.

Simulators
Today, many modeling devices, such as the Line 6 POD and Fender Cyber Twin, depict the sound of the Fender Vibratone. Early Rotary Speaker Simulators, like the Shin-ei Uni-Vibe or Dunlop Rotovibe pedals, became viable alternatives for guitarists, but never quite fully reproduced the three-dimensional, moving-air, and Doppler effects they attempted to emulate.  Instead, they themselves became a new type of effect with their own sound signatures. Many cabinets similar to the Vibratone have come and gone, and there are a few models in current production as well. Guitar pedal manufacturers have also developed analog and digital pedals that quite realistically approximate the rotary effect. Here are a few examples (some may be out of production):
Dunlop Univibe,
Dunlop Rotovibe,
Univox Univibe,
Korg G4,
Pigtronix Rototron,
Line 6 Roto Machine,
Voodoo Lab Micro Vibe,
Hammond “Cream” Digital Leslie Pedal,
Hammond Leslie G,
Boss RT-20 Rotary Ensemble,
Dawner Prince Pulse,
Strymon Lex,
Electro-Harmonix Lester-G (and K), 
Neo Ventilator,
Neo MicroVent 16, 
Fulltone DejaVibe, 
Tech21 RotoChoir, 
DLS Effects RotoSpin, 
Digitech Ventura Vibe, Alexander Pedals Sugarcube, 
H&K Rotosphere,
Danelectro Rocky Road, Danelectro Big Spender, TC Electronic VibraClone, Keeley DynoMyRoto, 
NUX Roctary, Mooer Soul Shiver, & Fender's own The Pinwheel.

See also
Leslie speaker

External links
Inside The Fender Vibratone - This web page has everything you need to know and more about the Vibratone.
1971 Fender Vibratone Owner's Manual

Loudspeakers